The European University (Portuguese: Universidade Europeia, abbr.: UE), also known as the European University of Lisbon and the European University at Lisbon (Portuguese: Universidade Europeia em Lisboa, abbr.: UEL) is a private university in Lisbon, Portugal.

The school was owned by Laureate Education, Inc., is now part of ENSILIS  and has 2,300 students.

History
Founded in 1962 as Higher Institute of Administration and Languages (ISLA), the school was purchased in 2011.  In 2013, Higher Institute of Administration and Languages (ISLA) later changed its name to Universidade Europeia de Lisboa.
In 2018, Universidade Europeia was acquired by PERMIRA (https://www.permira.com).

During 2010/2011 the University has adapted almost all the teachings it offers to the European Higher Education Area.

Rectors

References

Private universities and colleges in Portugal
Education in Lisbon